The University of Minnesota Medical School is the medical school of the University of Minnesota. It is a combination of two campuses situated in Minneapolis and Duluth, Minnesota.
The University of Minnesota Medical School is also part of one of the largest Academic Health Centers (AHC) in the United States. This center allows health professionals to train collaboratively across interdisciplinary teams throughout the course of their training programs. The AHC comprises the Medical School, School of Dentistry, School of Nursing, College of Pharmacy, School of Public Health, and the College of Veterinary Medicine.

History
The University of Minnesota Medical School began in the late nineteenth century when three of the private medical schools in the Twin Cities in Minnesota offered up their charters and merged their programs to form the University of Minnesota Medical School. A fourth school was absorbed in the early twentieth century. As a consequence of these mergers in 1888 and 1908, the school is the only medical school in the Twin Cities or Duluth and is one of only two in the state, the other being the Mayo Clinic Alix School of Medicine in Rochester, Minnesota.

The University of Minnesota Medical School's older buildings include the Mayo Memorial Building (1954) and Jackson Hall (1912). Jackson Hall was built as the home of the Institute of Anatomy and is still the site of anatomy instruction for medical students, undergraduates, and students of dentistry, nursing, physical therapy, and mortuary science. More visible today are the 1978 Phillips-Wangensteen and Moos Tower buildings. A new University Hospital overlooking the river was completed in 1986. The University began its partnership with Fairview Health Services in 1997, bringing the University Hospital under Fairview operations and eventually moving pediatrics to the West Bank. In 2011, a new pediatric hospital was opened. The M Health Fairview Masonic Children’s Hospital provides pediatric programs from surgery, imaging and neonatal and pediatric intensive care to cardiac and oncology (cancer care) services and blood and marrow and organ transplantation.

The Duluth program began in late 1972. It is now a branch campus of the medical school, specializing in the training of physicians for rural and small-town settings in rural Minnesota. The University of Minnesota Medical School Duluth Campus is ranked #2 in the nation for training American Indian and Alaskan Indian physicians, according to the Association of American Medical Colleges. Students spend their first two years on the Duluth campus before transferring down to the Twin Cities class for rotations and clinical lessons.

Accomplishments 
The University of Minnesota Medical School research history includes:

 First successful open-heart surgery by John Lewis, Walton Lillehei, Richard Varco and others in 1952
 The first portable cardiac pacemaker was invented by Earl Bakken with the help of Walton Lillehei and Richard Varco in 1957
 First pancreas-kidney transplant by Richard Lillehei and William Kelly in 1966
 First intestinal transplant by Richard Lillehei in 1966
 First bone marrow transplant by Robert Good in 1968
 The field of Medical Oncology was pioneered by B.J. Kennedy in 1972
 First total pancreatectomy and islet-auto transplant (T-PIAT) in 1977
 First bone marrow and cord blood transplant by John Wagner and Jakub Tolar in 2007
 The first cord blood transplant aimed at curing leukemia and HIV/AIDS was performed in 2013

The medical school has more than 17,000 alumni as of 2022. As of 2017, 70% of the state's physicians had taken classes there. A 2010 study in the Annals of Internal Medicine found the University of Minnesota Medical School to be one of only two of 141 medical schools in the United States to be in the top quartile for NIH funding, output of primary care physicians, and social mission score.

Academics
The University of Minnesota Medical School offers seven dual-degree programs for students interested in combining their medical education with a degree in medical research (MD/PhD), public health (MD/MPH), biomedical engineering (MD/MS), law (MD/JD), business (MD/MBA), or health informatics (MD/MHI). The Medical School also offers 10 individualized pathways for learners to experience a longitudinal integrated clerkships at a variety of hosting sites, each with a different focus. The first longitudinal integrated clerkship in the country was designed and implemented at the University of Minnesota Medical School in 1971. Jack Verby created the Rural Physicians Associate Program (RPAP) as a workforce initiative for rural Minnesota. This program continues today.

In addition to training medical students for their MD degrees, the University of Minnesota Medical School also has numerous residencies and fellowships as part of their graduate medical education programs. These residencies and fellowships are hosted at a variety of health systems across the Twin Cities and Minnesota, adding variety in patient populations and case loads to learners' experience.

The larger of the two campuses is in the Twin Cities. This campus has approximately 170 students in each of the first two years of medical school with a mixture of traditional medical students and students pursuing combined advanced degrees such as a Ph.D. through a MSTP scholarship. As the larger of the two campuses, the Twin Cities campus provides increased opportunities for research and specialty care and also provides the main clinical education site for both campuses. Thus, at the end of the fourth year, the total graduating class at Minneapolis usually exceeds 220 students. The University of Minnesota Medical school makes use of many teaching hospitals in the Twin Cities area. The University of Minnesota Medical Center is just one of these; others include Hennepin County Medical Center (HCMC), Regions Hospital (St. Paul), North Memorial Hospital (Robbinsdale), Children Hospital of Minneapolis and St Paul, Abbott Northwestern Hospital, and the Minneapolis Veteran's Administration Hospital.

The Duluth campus, formerly the University of Minnesota Duluth School of Medicine, has approximately 65  students enrolled for each of the first two years of medical school as of 2022, after which they transfer to the Twin Cities campus for their clinical rotations. The mission of the Duluth Campus is to select and educate students who will likely select Family Medicine/Primary Care and practice in rural locations. Duluth is also a primary site for the Center for American Indian and Minority Health which aims to educate increased numbers of Native American students as medical professionals.

Research 
In 2014, with the support of Governor Mark Dayton and the Minnesota legislature, the University of Minnesota Medical School created Medical Discovery Teams (MDT) to support the Medical School's efforts to increase national preeminence by attracting and retaining world-class faculty, staff, students, and residents. These Medical Discovery Teams are structured to help achieve the state's goals of improving patient and population health, lowering costs, and improving healthcare experiences. The four Medical Discovery Teams were created to focus specifically on four of the biggest health problems facing Minnesota: 

 Medical Discovery Team on Addiction- The mission of the MDT on addiction is to make rapid advancements in the understanding of brain mechanisms of addiction and relapse, and translate discoveries into new effective therapies that prevent and treat addiction. 
 Memory Keepers Medical Discovery Team- The mission of the Memory Keepers Medical Discovery Team is to support an environment of Team Science to conduct community-based participatory action research on dementia in Indigenous and rural communities with the aim of achieving health equity.
 The Institute on the Biology of Aging and Metabolism- The mission of the iBAM MDT is to extend healthy aging by focusing on research and testing pharmaceutical approaches to lessen or eliminate age-related diseases and conditions. Led by Laura Niedernhofer, this group works on Senolytic Drugs as a potential therapeutic approach to lessen the impacts of aging. 
 Discovery Team for Optical Imaging and Brain Science- The mission of the MDT on Optical Imaging and Brain Science is to produce a dynamic blueprint of the functioning brain using new methods for large-scale monitoring and interrogation of neural activity. 

Research conducted by Sylvain Lesné in the area of Alzheimer's disease is under investigation as of July 2022; a Science magazine article covered allegations that images were manipulated in a 2006 Nature publication, co-authored by Karen Ashe and others.

Patient care 
Patient care at the University of Minnesota Medical School happens through partnerships with hospitals and clinics, in particular through M Health Fairview, as well as within its group practice, University of Minnesota Physicians (M Physicians). 

University of Minnesota Physicians is the multi-specialty group practice of the University of Minnesota Medical School faculty. 

A clinical partnership has resulted in M Health Fairview—a collaboration between the University of Minnesota, University of Minnesota Physicians, and Fairview Health Services which was finalized with a 2019 agreement. The expanded partnership of the University of Minnesota, University of Minnesota Physicians, and Fairview brings together 11 hospitals, 56 primary care clinics, and other services into a shared care delivery system led by a single leadership structure, led by Fairview CEO James Hereford and Medical School Dean Jakub Tolar, MD. This academic health system serves hundreds of thousands of patients annually.

Rankings
In its 2023 report, U.S. News & World Report ranked the University of Minnesota Medical School 3rd in the nation for primary care,  43rd in the United States for medical research, and 4th for family medicine research.

The University of Minnesota Medical School was ranked 29th in the country in the 2021 Blue Ridge Rankings, based on annual NIH funding of $228,884,157.

The University of Minnesota Medical School is ranked #66 on U.S. News & World Report Best Global Universities for Clinical Medicine.

The University of Minnesota Medical School is ranked #26 by Shanghai Ranking for Medical Technology and #101 for Clinical Medicine 

The University of Minnesota Medical School is ranked #67 by CEOWorld's Best Medical Schools in the World 2022

Notable alumni and faculty

Department of Surgery
C. Walton Lillehei
 Russell M. Nelson - pioneer in open heart surgery, later president of the Church of Jesus Christ of Latter-day Saints
Norman Shumway
Owen Harding Wangensteen

Department of Medicine
Kathleen Annette
Paul P. Boswell
Mary A. G. Dight
Robert A. Good
B. J. Kennedy
Maureen Reed
Vernon L. Sommerdorf

Department of Pediatrics
Jakub Tolar
Damien Fair

References

External links

Medical schools in Minnesota
Medical School
Mortuary schools
Educational institutions established in 1888
1888 establishments in Minnesota